The Caucasian Front, also known as Caucasus Front or the Caucasian Mujahideen,  established in May 2005 as an Islamic structural unit of the Chechen Republic of Ichkeria's armed forces by the decree of the fourth president of the Chechen Republic of Ichkeria, Abdul-Halim Sadulayev. In September 2006, Ali Taziev was appointed as the emir and commander-in-chief of the Caucasian Front by Dokku Umarov. The group eventually reorganized as "Vilayat Nokhchicho" in 2007 and became a part of the Caucasus Emirate.

History
The group united various rebel Jamaat groups across the North Caucasus, including the Ingush Jamaat, Shariat Jamaat, Yarmuk Jamaat and Kataib al-Khoul, to fight the Russian rule not only in Chechnya but also in the rest of the Caucasus. It was led by a Chechen commander Shamil Basayev until his death in July 2006 and since then by Ali Taziev. In October 2007 the Caucasian Front later became the Caucasus Emirate, a self proclaimed emirate.

While the anti-Russian local insurgencies in North Caucasus started even before the formal creation of the Caucasian Front, two months after Aslan Maskhadov's death, the new Chechen leader Abdul-Halim Sadulayev officially announced that they had formed a Caucasus Front within the framework of "reforming the system of military-political power." The movement had taken on a new role as the official ideological, logistical and, probably, financial hub of the new insurgency in the North Caucasus. Increasingly frequent clashes between federal forces and local rebels continued in Dagestan and Ingushetia, while sporadic fighting erupts in the other southern Russia regions. Before the declaration of the Caucasus Emirate, the movement had conducted two-large scale attacks, the 2004 Nazran raid in Ingushetia and the 2005 Nalchik raid in Kabardino-Balkaria. The movement also launched many smaller attacks such as the 2006 Avtury ambush & 2007 Zhani-Vedeno ambush.

Fronts of the Caucasian front

Fronts within the Chechen Republic 
 Northern Front (later became northeastern front and northwestern front)
 Eastern front (later became southeastern front)

Fronts beyond the Chechen Republic 
In October 2006, Dokku Umarov established two new fronts beyond the North Caucasus region.

 Volga front (became Idel-Ural wilayah) 
 Ural front

Sectors of the Caucasian front
The Caucasian Front was also divided into several sectors (wilayat). 

 Adygean sector
 Ingush sector
 Kabardino-Balkarian sector
 Karachay-Cherkess sector
 Krasnodar sector 
 Ossetian sector
 Stavropol sector

List of attacks
2004 Nazran raid: 87 killed
2005 Nalchik raid: 138 killed
2006 Avtury ambush: 7 killed
2007 Zhani-Vedeno ambush: 5 killed

See also
 Islamic International Brigade

References

External link

 
Islamism in Chechnya
Jihadist groups
National liberation movements
Political organizations based in Russia
Organized crime by ethnic or national origin